"Never Gonna Not Dance Again" is a song by American singer Pink. It was released on November 4, 2022, as the lead single from her ninth studio album Trustfall.

Background and release
On October 6, 2022, Pink announced that she would be touring in Europe as part of her Summer Carnival Tour in 2023. On October 17, 2022, two weeks before the song's release, Pink teased the song and released a snippet on social media. The song became available to stream on Apple Music and Spotify on November 4, 2022.

Composition
The song was described as "an upbeat anthem about dancing through our perpetually hard times". An associated press release called the track "vibrant, joyful and euphoric". In an interview with Good Morning America, Pink said that the song reflected her desire to just find happiness, saying "you can take everything I have, but you can't take my joy." In the same interview, she noted that insecurities should not limit people from doing what they want.

Music video
The music video was released on YouTube the same day. The singer is seen wearing a colourful outfit and roller skating in a grocery store and a parking lot. At the end, the former transforms into a nightclub.

Charts

Weekly charts

Year-end charts

Release history

References

2022 singles
2022 songs
Pink (singer) songs
RCA Records singles
Songs written by Pink (singer)
Songs written by Max Martin
Songs written by Shellback (record producer)
Song recordings produced by Max Martin
Song recordings produced by Shellback (record producer)